WKIS (99.9 FM) is a commercial radio station licensed to Boca Raton, Florida, and serving South Florida, including the Miami-Fort Lauderdale radio market.  It is owned by Audacy, Inc. and airs a country music radio format.  Its studios are located in Audacy's Miami office on Northeast Second Avenue.  The transmitter tower is off NW 210 Street in Miami Gardens, shared with WTVJ.

WKIS broadcasts in the HD Radio format.  Its HD2 subchannel carries the sports radio programming of co-owned WQAM.

History

WWOG
The station first signed on the air on September 1, 1965 as WWOG.  It was originally a non-commercial Christian radio station, owned by Homer and Carole Akers.  In the 1970s, it was a beautiful music outlet, still owned by the Akers, under the corporate name WWOG, Inc.

Country music
In 1979, WWOG was bought by the Sunshine Wireless Company.  The new owner changed its call sign to WKQS-FM, and switched it to easy listening as "Kiss-FM."  The WWOG call letters were later transferred to a new non-commercial religious radio station at 88.1, owned by the Boca Raton Christian School.  (That station is now WAYF, owned by the WAY-FM Network.) The format was switched to country music in September 1981.

In 1980, Sunshine Wireless bought AM 560 WQAM.  WQAM had been a long-time Top 40 station but Sunshine switched it to country music.  Sunshine now had an AM country station, with personality DJs, NBC News and local information, as well as WKQS, an FM country station, with less chatter and more current country hits.

In 1988, WKQS changed call letters to WKIS. Around this time, WQAM would leave the country music format, first playing oldies and then switching to all-sports.  This left WKIS as Miami's only country music outlet.

Ownership changes
The Beasley Broadcast Group bought both WKIS and WQAM in the late 1990s, but continued the country music and sports formats on each station.  The studios and offices were moved to Sheridan Street in Hollywood.

On October 2, 2014, Beasley announced that it would trade five radio stations in Philadelphia and Miami, including WKIS, to CBS Radio, in exchange for 14 stations located in Tampa, Charlotte and Philadelphia. The swap was completed on December 1, 2014.

On February 2, 2017, CBS Radio announced it would merge with Entercom. The merger was approved on November 9, 2017, and was consummated on November 17.

References

External links

KIS
Country radio stations in the United States
Radio stations established in 1965
1965 establishments in Florida
Audacy, Inc. radio stations